The Hayseeds is a 1933 Australian musical comedy from Beaumont Smith. It centres on the rural family, the Hayseeds, about whom Smith had previously made six silent films, starting with Our Friends, the Hayseeds (1917). He retired from directing in 1925 but decided to revive the series in the wake of the box office success of On Our Selection (1932). It was the first starring role in a movie for stage actor Cecil Kellaway.

It was also known as The Hayseeds Come to Town.

Plot
Wealthy Mary Townleigh  gets lost in the bush and hurts her ankle, but is rescued and stays with the Hayseed family. She starts a romance with their neighbour, Englishman John Manners. When Joe Hayseed and his girlfriend Pansy Regan decide to get married, the Hayseeds and John visit Sydney to stay with the Townleighs. John is accused of being a fugitive of justice but is eventually proved innocent and he and Mary get married.

Cast
 Cecil Kellaway as Dad Hayseed
 Kenneth Brampton as Mr. Townleigh
 Arthur Clarke as John Manners
 Shirley Dale as Mary Townleigh
 Bryan Kellaway as Billy
 John Moore as Henry Westcott
 Tal Ordell as Joe Hayseed
 Vincent Pantin as Lord Mornington
 Molly Raynor as Pansy Ragen
 Phyllis Steadman as Polly
 Stan Tolhurst as Sam
 Katie Towers as Mum Hayseed
 the J.C. Williamson Chorus (singing hikers)
 the Richard White Girls
 Jimmy Coates and his Orchestra

Production
The movie was shot at Cinesound's studios in Rushcutter's Bay in August and September 1933, with location work near Pymble. Many of the cast, including Kellaway, John Moore and Shirley Dale, were appearing in the play Music in the Air during filming.

The movie was a semi musical with a number of songs and dance sequences. The latter were produced by Richard White, who ran a dance academy in Sydney.

Cecil Kellaway's son, Brian, made his film debut alongside his father.

Director
There is some debate as to the true director of the film. While some sources say that Beaumont Smith both scripted and directed the picture, Smith himself announced that Raymond Longford would direct the picture, and newspapers of the era also gave the credit to Longford.

Reception
Reviews for the film were mixed but it proved popular with audiences on release.

By the end of 1934 it was estimated to have earned £16,000 in Australia and an overall profit of £5,900.

The film was still screening in cinemas in 1950.

References

External links
The Hayseeds in the Internet Movie Database
The Hayseeds at Australian Screen Online
The Hayseeds at National Film and Sound Archive
The Hayseeds at Oz Movies

1933 films
Films directed by Beaumont Smith
Films directed by Raymond Longford
Australian black-and-white films
Australian musical drama films
1930s musical drama films
1933 drama films